Jochen Kühner (born 15 October 1980 in Speyer) is a German rower.  At the 2008 and 2012 Summer Olympics, he competed in the men's lightweight four.  He has also been world champion in this event, along with his brother Martin Kühner, Jost Schömann-Finck, and Matthias Schömann-Finck.  He has also been world champion in the men's lightweight eight, and runner up in the men's lightweight pair, again with his brother.

Competitions
 2008 Summer Olympics – Men's lightweight coxless four
 2012 Summer Olympics – Men's lightweight coxless four
 2007 World Rowing Championships – LM2- – 2nd place (silver medal)
 2009 World Rowing Championships – LM4- – 1st place (gold medal)
 2010 World Rowing Championships – LM8+ – 1st place (gold medal)
 2012 World Rowing Championships – LM8+ – 1st place (gold medal)
 2009 European Rowing Championships – LM4- – 2nd place (silver medal)
 2010 European Rowing Championships – LM4- – 1st place (gold medal)

See also
 Germany at the 2008 Summer Olympics
 Germany at the 2012 Summer Olympics

References 

 
 

1980 births
Living people
People from Speyer
Olympic rowers of Germany
Rowers at the 2008 Summer Olympics
Rowers at the 2012 Summer Olympics
World Rowing Championships medalists for Germany
German male rowers
Sportspeople from Rhineland-Palatinate